In mathematics, a polygonal number is a number represented  as dots or pebbles arranged in the shape of a regular polygon. The dots are thought of as alphas (units). These are one type of 2-dimensional figurate numbers.

Definition and examples 

The number 10 for example, can be arranged as a triangle (see triangular number):

{|
| align="center" style="line-height: 0;" | 
|}

But 10 cannot be arranged as a square. The number 9, on the other hand, can be (see square number):

{|
| align="center" style="line-height: 0;" | 
|}

Some numbers, like 36, can be arranged both as a square and as a triangle (see square triangular number):

{| cellpadding="5"
|- align="center" valign="bottom"
| style="line-height: 0; display: inline-block;"|
| style="line-height: 0; display: inline-block"|
|}

By convention, 1 is the first polygonal number for any number of sides.  The rule for enlarging the polygon to the next size is to extend two adjacent arms by one point and to then add the required extra sides between those points.  In the following diagrams, each extra layer is shown as in red.

Triangular numbers

Square numbers

Polygons with higher numbers of sides, such as pentagons and hexagons, can also be constructed according to this rule, although the dots will no longer form a perfectly regular lattice like above.

Pentagonal numbers

Hexagonal numbers

Formula
If  is the number of sides in a polygon, the formula for the th -gonal number  is

or

The th -gonal number is also related to the triangular numbers  as follows:

Thus:

For a given -gonal number , one can find  by

and one can find  by

.

Every hexagonal number is also a triangular number
Applying the formula above:

to the case of 6 sides gives:

but since:

it follows that:

This shows that the th hexagonal number  is also the th triangular number .  We can find every hexagonal number by simply taking the odd-numbered triangular numbers:

1, 3, 6, 10, 15, 21, 28, 36, 45, 55, 66, ...

Table of values
The first 6 values in the column "sum of reciprocals", for triangular to octagonal numbers, come from a published solution to the general problem, which also gives a general formula for any number of sides, in terms of the digamma function.

The On-Line Encyclopedia of Integer Sequences eschews terms using Greek prefixes (e.g., "octagonal") in favor of terms using numerals (i.e., "8-gonal").

A property of this table can be expressed by the following identity (see ):

with

Combinations
Some numbers, such as 36 which is both square and triangular, fall into two polygonal sets. The problem of determining, given two such sets, all numbers that belong to both can be solved by reducing the problem to Pell's equation. The simplest example of this is the sequence of square triangular numbers.

{| class="wikitable" border="1"
|-
! 
! 
! Sequence
! OEIS number
|-
|4
|3
|1, 36, 1225, 41616, 1413721, 48024900, 1631432881, 55420693056, 1882672131025, 63955431761796, 2172602007770041, 73804512832419600, 2507180834294496361, 85170343853180456676, 2893284510173841030625, 98286503002057414584576, 3338847817559778254844961, ...
| 
|-
|5
|3
|1, 210, 40755, 7906276, 1533776805, 297544793910, 57722156241751, 11197800766105800, 2172315626468283465, …
| 
|-
|5
|4
|1, 9801, 94109401, 903638458801, 8676736387298001, 83314021887196947001, 799981229484128697805801, ...
| 
|-
|6
|3
|All hexagonal numbers are also triangular.
| 
|-
|6
|4
|1, 1225, 1413721, 1631432881, 1882672131025, 2172602007770041, 2507180834294496361, 2893284510173841030625, 3338847817559778254844961, 3853027488179473932250054441, ...
| 
|-
|6
|5
|1, 40755, 1533776805, …
| 
|-
|7
|3
|1, 55, 121771, 5720653, 12625478965, 593128762435, 1309034909945503, 61496776341083161, 135723357520344181225, 6376108764003055554511, 14072069153115290487843091, …
| 
|-
|7
|4
|1, 81, 5929, 2307361, 168662169, 12328771225, 4797839017609, 350709705290025, 25635978392186449, 9976444135331412025, …
| 
|-
|7
|5
|1, 4347, 16701685, 64167869935, …
| 
|-
|7
|6
|1, 121771, 12625478965, …
| 
|-
|8
|3
|1, 21, 11781, 203841, …
| 
|-
|8
|4
|1, 225, 43681, 8473921, 1643897025, 318907548961, 61866420601441, 12001766689130625, 2328280871270739841, 451674487259834398561, 87622522247536602581025, 16998317641534841066320321,  …
| 
|-
|8
|5
|1, 176, 1575425, 234631320, …
| 
|-
|8
|6
|1, 11781, 113123361, …
| 
|-
|8
|7
|1, 297045, 69010153345, …
| 
|-
|9
|3
|1, 325, 82621, 20985481, …
|  
|-
|9
|4
|1, 9, 1089, 8281, 978121, 7436529, 878351769, 6677994961, 788758910641, 5996832038649, 708304623404049, 5385148492712041, 636056763057925561, ...
|  
|-
|9
|5
|1, 651, 180868051, …
|  
|-
|9
|6
|1, 325, 5330229625, …
|  
|-
|9
|7
|1, 26884, 542041975, …
|  
|-
|9
|8
|1, 631125, 286703855361, …
|  
|-
|}

The problem of finding numbers that belong to three polygonal sets is more difficult. A computer search for pentagonal square triangular numbers has yielded only the trivial value of 1, though a proof that there are no other such numbers has yet to be found.

The number 1225 is hecatonicositetragonal, hexacontagonal, icosienneagonal, hexagonal, square, and triangular.

The only polygonal set that is contained entirely in another polygonal set is the set of hexagonal numbers, which is contained in the set of triangular numbers.

See also

 Centered polygonal number
Polyhedral number
 Fermat polygonal number theorem

Notes

References
The Penguin Dictionary of Curious and Interesting Numbers, David Wells (Penguin Books, 1997) [].
Polygonal numbers at PlanetMath

External links
 
Polygonal Numbers: Every s-polygonal number between 1 and 1000 clickable for 2<=s<=337

 Polygonal Number Counting Function: http://www.mathisfunforum.com/viewtopic.php?id=17853

Figurate numbers